The 2017 Internazionali di Tennis dell'Umbria was a professional tennis tournament played on clay courts. It was the 11th edition of the men's tournament which was part of the 2017 ATP Challenger Tour. The event took place at the Tennis Club Todi in Todi, Italy between 19 – 25 June 2017.

Singles main draw entrants

Seeds 

 1 Rankings as of 12 June 2017.

Other entrants 
The following players received wildcards into the singles main draw:
  Simone Bolelli
  Liam Caruana
  Gianluca Mager
  Lorenzo Sonego

The following player received entry into the singles main draw as an alternate:
  Miljan Zekić

The following players received entry from the qualifying draw:
  Daniel Elahi Galán
  Andreas Haider-Maurer
  Artem Smirnov
  Carlos Taberner

Champions

Singles 

  Federico Delbonis def.  Marco Cecchinato 7–5, 6–1.

Doubles 

  Steven de Waard /  Ben McLachlan def.  Marin Draganja /  Tomislav Draganja 6–7(7–9), 6–4, [10–7].

References

2017 ATP Challenger Tour
2017
2017 in Italian tennis